Rhosydd Llanpumsaint is a Site of Special Scientific Interest (SSSI) in Carmarthenshire, Wales.

SSSI

The Rhosydd Llanpumsaint site is notable for geomorphological features which in turn support special biological features. The site - field and peatland - has on its west side numerous oval depressions of up to  diameter thought to have been formed by mineral pillars under permafrost ice which have collapsed on the retreat of the ice, to leave an undulating surface the depressions of which have become sediment and peat filled. The site is one of the best examples of ramparted ground-ice depression features in Wales. The depressions, in turn, provide a mire habitat for a variety of plants such as red bog moss (Sphagnum capillifolium), hare's-tail cotton-grass (Eriophorum vaginatum), cross-leaved heath (Erica tetralix) and heather (Calluna vulgaris). The mix of plants in any depression varies according to conditions in and water supply for the depression, and the site hosts a wide and diverse set of species including the only known colony of the liverwort (Pallavicinia lyellii) in Carmarthenshire.

See also
List of Sites of Special Scientific Interest in Carmarthenshire

References

External links
SSSI Citation for Rhosydd Llanpumsaint
Citation map for Rhosydd LlanpumsaintYour Special Site and its Future'' - Rhosydd Llanpumsaint SSSI overview from Natural Resources Wales
Rhosydd Llanpumsaint SSSI marked on DEFRA's MAGIC Map

Sites of Special Scientific Interest in Carmarthen & Dinefwr